Ladda carnis is a species of butterfly in the family Hesperiidae. It is found in Bolivia and Peru.

Subspecies
Ladda carnis carnis - Bolivia
Ladda carnis sondra Evans, 1955 - Peru

References

Butterflies described in 1955